The 2013–14 Baylor Bears basketball team represented Baylor University in the 2013–14 NCAA Division I men's basketball season. This was head coach Scott Drew's eleventh season at Baylor. The Bears competed in the Big 12 Conference and played their home games at the Ferrell Center. They finished the season 26–12, 9–9 in Big 12 play to finish in a tie for sixth place. They advanced to the championship game of the Big 12 tournament where they lost to Iowa State. They received an at-large bid to the NCAA tournament where they defeated Nebraska and Creighton to advance to the Sweet Sixteen where they lost to Wisconsin.

Pre-season

Departures

Roster
Source

Rankings

Schedule and results

|-
! colspan=9 style="background:#004834; color:#FDBB2F;" |Non-conference regular season

|-
!colspan=9 style="background:#004834; color:#FDBB2F;" |Big 12 regular season

|-
! colspan=9 style="background:#004834; color:#FDBB2F;" | Big 12 tournament

|-
! colspan=9 style="background:#004834; color:#FDBB2F;" | NCAA tournament

References

Baylor
Baylor Bears men's basketball seasons
Baylor